Saddam Hussein, the deposed president of Iraq, was captured by the United States military forces in the town of Ad-Dawr, Iraq on 13 December 2003. Codenamed Operation Red Dawn, this military operation was named after the 1984 American film Red Dawn.

The mission was executed by joint operations Task Force 121—an elite and covert joint special operations team, supported by the 1st Brigade Combat Team (led by Colonel James Hickey) of the 4th Infantry Division, commanded by Major General Raymond Odierno.

They searched two sites, "Wolverine 1" and "Wolverine 2", outside the town of ad-Dawr, but did not find Hussein. A continued search between the two sites found Hussein hiding in a "spider hole" at 20:30 hrs local Iraqi time. Hussein did not resist capture.

Background
Hussein disappeared from public view soon after the 2003 invasion of Iraq. The American military labelled him "High Value Target Number One" (HVT1) and began one of the largest manhunts in history.

Between July and December 2003, JSOC's Task Force 121 carried out twelve unsuccessful raids to find Saddam Hussein, together with 600 other operations against targets, including 300 interrogations. On 1 December 2003, a former driver divulged the name Muhammed Ibrahim Omar al-Musslit, Saddam's right-hand man, known to TF 121 as "the source" or "the fatman". Over the next two weeks, nearly 40 members of his family were interrogated to ascertain his location. On 12 December 2003, a raid on a house in Baghdad that was being used as an insurgent headquarters captured Omar. Early the next morning he revealed where Saddam may be found. This intelligence and other intelligence from detained former members of the Ba'ath Party, supported by signals intelligence from the ISA, finally pinpointed Hussein at a remote farm compound south of Tikrit.

Operation
Operation Red Dawn was launched after gaining actionable intelligence identifying two likely locations of Saddam's whereabouts code-named Wolverine 1 and Wolverine 2, near the town of ad-Dawr. C squadron Delta Force, ISA operators under Task Force 121 and the First Brigade Combat team of the 4th ID, conducted the operation. The operation was named after the 1984 film of the same name starring Patrick Swayze. The site names of "Wolverine 1" and "Wolverine 2" are also a reference to the American insurgent group in the movie The Wolverines. The Forces involved in the operation consisted of approximately 600 soldiers including cavalry, artillery, aviation, engineer, and special operations forces.

The forces cleared the two objectives but initially did not find the target. Then, as the operators were finishing and the helicopters called in to extract them, one soldier kicked a piece of flooring to one side, exposing a spider hole; he prepared to throw a fragmentation grenade into it – in case it led to an insurgent tunnel system, when suddenly Hussein appeared. The Delta operator struck him with the stock of his M4 carbine and disarmed him of a Glock 18C.

Hussein surrendered and offered no resistance; he was taken by a MH-6 Little Bird from the 160th SOAR to the Tikrit Mission Support Site where he was properly identified. He was then taken in an MH-60K Blackhawk helicopter by 160th SOAR from Tikrit to Baghdad and into custody at Baghdad International Airport. Along with the Glock, an AK-47 and $750,000 in US bank notes were recovered from the spider hole.

Two other individuals were also detained. There were no casualties in the operation.

Reactions

International reactions

Middle East

: The official Bahrain News Agency quoted a foreign ministry spokesman who said [his capture] should restore unity and cohesion to the Iraqis, to build "a promising future in a prosperous Iraq enjoying security and co-operating with its neighbors to promote stability and development" in the region.

: Foreign Minister Ahmed Maher said, "I don't think anyone will be sad over Saddam Hussein. His arrest does not change the fact that his regime was finished, and it is the natural consequence of the regime's fall. The Iraqi regime had harmed the Iraqi people, and had pulled the Arab region into several storms."

: Vice President Mohammad-Ali Abtahi expressed satisfaction, stating, "I am happy they have arrested a criminal, whoever it may be, and I am even more happy, because it is a criminal who committed so many crimes against Iranians." Abtahi joined the call for justice, adding, "Iranians have suffered much, because of him, and [the] mass graves in Iraq prove the crimes he has committed against the Iraqi people".

: The government spokeswoman said they hoped that a page has been turned and that the Iraqi people would be able to assume their responsibilities as soon as possible and build their future according to their will. The first and last word concerning the capture of Saddam Hussein or his fate must be given to the Iraqi people.

: The country was tense at news of the U.S. capture of Saddam Hussein at the weekend; people were surprised by how easily he was captured, however, it did not equal a U.S. military victory. "The capture of Saddam will not save the U.S. from the world's condemnation for supporting the greater enemy, Israeli P.M. Ariel Sharon", said Selim Al-Hoss, ex-Lebanese Prime Minister.

: Palestinian President Yasser Arafat's government had no comment; however Abdel-Aziz al-Rantissi, a senior Hamas leader, said the U.S. would "pay a very high price for the mistake" of capturing Saddam Hussein. Following Saddam's capture, the climate among Palestinians was disbelief and gloom.

: Prince Bandar bin Sultan, Saudi ambassador to the United States, stated that "Saddam Hussein was a menace to the Arab world."

: Syrian Information Minister Ahmad al-Hassan advised Syria's position on Iraq was not based on the fate of individuals. We want an Iraq that preserves its territorial integrity, its unity and its sovereignty.

Asia

: The Afghan government welcomed news of the capture of Saddam Hussein, deeming it a warning to opposition leaders such as Osama Bin Laden and Mullah Omar.

: Foreign Minister Morshed Khan was quoted as saying, "We hope this will pave the way for the Iraqi people to have a government of their own, a government by the people and for the people of Iraq."

: Foreign Ministry spokesman Liu Jianchao hoped that the latest development of the situation in Iraq was conducive to the Iraqi people taking their destiny into their own hands, and to realising peace and stability in Iraq.

: Sing Tao Daily editorialized: "The desperate capture of Iraqi former president Saddam symbolizes the bad fate of a corrupt dictator and also the best Christmas present this year for US President George Bush, but for the Iraqis who have undergone a baptism of fire in the war, the days of peace are still far away, and the road of reconstruction is as long and arduous as before." South China Morning Post editorialized: "With Hussein's capture, Iraqis can at last begin to close this brutal and tragic chapter in their history."

: The Indian government's response to the capture of Saddam Hussein was measured and guarded. When Secretary of State Colin Powell called Foreign Minister Yashwant Sinha on Monday to discuss the capture of Saddam, whom Washington had named a tyrant, Sinha is said to have reacted in a manner that did not echo the effusion flowing from the rest of the world. In the words of an official with the foreign ministry, Sinha "maintained a stiff upper lip".

Sinha, in his brief conversation with Powell, merely expressed hope that such developments would contribute to the stabilization of Iraq. Powell told Sinha that the capture would bring "a change in the existing situation and lead to greater respect for the Iraqi Governing Council."

: In Indonesia, the reaction was muted. Foreign Ministry spokesman Marty Natalegawa says the arrest of the former Iraqi president had not changed how Indonesia felt about the situation in Iraq. Indonesia's leaders strongly opposed the US-led invasion of Iraq. Indonesian leaders also said they hoped the capture of Saddam Hussein would help bring peace to Iraq and return control of the country back to its citizens.

: Prime Minister Junichiro Koizumi on Monday said he hoped that Saddam Hussein's capture would lead to improvements in Iraq. He said the capture would be positive if it brings major steps toward the stability and reconstruction of Iraq. Prime Minister Koizumi's cabinet had approved a controversial plan to send troops to Iraq. He said he would continue to assess the security situation in Iraq before dispatching the soldiers.

In Japan, Chief Cabinet Secretary Yasuo Fukuda agreed the arrest was "great news," but cautioned it would not necessarily lead to peace.

"The problem, however, is terrorism. I don't think the arrest of Saddam Hussein can stop all terror attacks," Fukuda said.

: The Malaysian government said the Iraqi people should decide how Saddam would be brought to justice on accusations of gross human rights violations.

Iraqis should "be given the right to decide on the manner and procedure of bringing Saddam Hussein to face justice," said Prime Minister Abdullah Ahmad Badawi, head of the Non-Aligned Movement. Foreign Minister Syed Hamid Albar expressed hope that the capture of Saddam Hussein would contribute towards bringing peace and stability in Iraq and the surrounding region and stated that the United Nations should now play a bigger role in achieving this objective. "With peace and stability in Iraq, we hope that an Iraqi government representing the free and independent Iraqi people could be set up to start the reconstruction process of that nationfor the benefit of its people," he said. He said the views and inputs of the Iraqis should be taken into account in deciding whatever action would be initiated against Saddam. Former Prime Minister Mahathir Mohammed urged a fair trial for Saddam Hussein.

: The response in Pakistan also was low-key. Foreign Office spokesman Masood Khan called the capture an important development.

: South Korea welcomed the news, which came hours after its government made a final decision to send 3,000 troops to Iraq.

: An hour after U.S. announced the captured, President Chen Shui Bian congratulated the U.S. for what he called "a big victory".

Europe

: The Flemish-language De Standaard newspaper editorialized that "Showing degrading pictures of a prisoner, even if he was a cruel tyrant, does not increase the moral authority of those who overpowered him."

: A statement from President Jacques Chirac said, "The president is delighted with Saddam Hussein's arrest."

: Chancellor Gerhard Schröder greeted the development "with much happiness." In a telegram to George W. Bush, he called for intensified efforts to rebuild Iraq.

: Top Curia official Renato Martino, a cardinal deacon and President of the Pontifical Council for Justice and Peace, attacked the way Saddam Hussein was treated by his captors, saying he had been dealt with like an animal. Martino said he had felt pity watching video of "this man destroyed, [the military] looking at his teeth as if he were a beast." The cardinal, a leading critic of the US-led war in Iraq, said he hoped the capture would not make matters "worse." Pope John Paul II did not comment.

: Poland at the time commanded thousands of international troops in Iraq. Defence Minister Jerzy Szmajdziński welcomed the news, but said the arrest could prompt retaliation from Saddam's supporters. "The coming days could be equally dangerous as these past days," he said.

: Foreign Minister Igor Ivanov said, "We think the arrest of Saddam Hussein will contribute to the strengthening of security in Iraq and to the process of political regulation in the country with the active participation of the United Nations."

: Prime Minister Tony Blair, President Bush's strongest Iraq War ally, called the capture good news for Iraqis, saying: "It removes the shadow that has been hanging over them for too long of the nightmare of a return to the Saddam regime."

North America
: Prime Minister Paul Martin congratulated U.S. troops Sunday and sent telegrams of congratulations to U.S. President George Bush and British Prime Minister Tony Blair. He would state that he was confident that the deposed Iraqi leader will be prosecuted fairly. "What's important is that he be tried before a tribunal that is just, that is credible and that has international recognition," said Martin. "I'm sure that will be the case." Martin spoke to reporters from his Montreal riding, said Saddam's capture will bolster reconstruction efforts in Iraq. "Now that he has been captured there's no doubt in my mind that we will now be able to move to a very very different level of reconstruction," he said. "This is a great victory to the coalition forces but the biggest winners of all of this will be the people of Iraq," he said.

:
President George W. Bush said that Saddam would "face the justice he denied to millions. For the Ba'athist holdouts responsible for the violence, there will be no return to the corrupt power and privilege they once held". 
Secretary of Defense Donald Rumsfeld stated, "Here was a man who was photographed hundreds of times shooting off rifles and showing how tough he was, and in fact, he wasn't very tough, he was cowering in a hole in the ground, and had a pistol and didn't use it, and certainly did not put up any fight at all. I think that ... he resulted in the death of an awful lot of Iraqi people, In the last analysis, he seemed not terribly brave." Rumsfeld said the U.S. has not decided whether to classify Saddam Hussein as a prisoner of war, but that the U.S. would abide the Geneva Conventions. More than 24 hours after his capture, the uncooperative Saddam Hussein had said little in his interrogation.

Oceania

: Prime Minister John Howard reacted to the news happily. He said the Iraqi people could breathe a sigh of relief now that the former dictator was no longer at large. The Australian Broadcasting Corporation interviewed him.

: Prime Minister Helen Clark reiterated the New Zealand legislature's opposition to capital punishment, with such opposition extending to the treatment of Saddam Hussein.

Africa
: People Daily newspaper
The capture of deposed Iraq leader Saddam Hussein is, no doubt, a major victory for the United States and the coalition of the willing, chief among which is Britain. The curtain has now fallen on one of the world's most ruthless and intriguing leaders.

International organizations

Secretary General Amr Mussa said the Iraqi people should "decide the fate of the old regime and its old leaders," alluding to the discovery of mass graves after Saddam's fall during the US invasion in April.

International Committee of the Red Cross
The International Committee of the Red Cross says the US-led coalition in Iraq had given the agency the "green light" to visit Saddam Hussein, the former Iraqi leader.

Red Cross spokesman Florian Westphal confirmed that ICRC visits to the captured Iraqi leader would go ahead according to international rules governing the detention of all prisoners of war. He said discussions are under way as to how and where those visits would take place.

A spokesman for Kofi Annan, United Nations Secretary General, said the capture "offers an opportunity to give fresh impetus to the search for peace and stability in Iraq".

Former U.N. chief weapons inspector Hans Blix said the Allied Coalition might ask Saddam Hussein meaningful questions about Iraq's nuclear, biological, and chemical weapons programmes, "He ought to know quite a lot, and be able to tell the story; we all want to get to the bottom of the barrel".

POW status

A Pentagon spokesman said he was given the status as he was the leader of the "old regime's military forces."

The spokesman, Major Michael Shavers, said Saddam, captured by US troops in December, was entitled to all the rights under the Geneva Conventions. The International Committee of the Red Cross had asked to visit the former Iraqi leader as soon as possible. The US spokesman did not give further details about Saddam Hussein's conditions of detention.

POW status for Saddam Hussein meant that the former Iraqi leader would be eligible to stand trial for war crimes.

There was controversy over TV pictures which showed Saddam Hussein undergoing a medical examination after his capture — footage regarded by some as a failure to protect him from public curiosity. A leading Vatican clergyman described the scenes as Saddam being "treated like a cow," and some sections of the Arab world were deeply offended by them. The US maintains that the pictures were shown to demonstrate to the Iraqi people that they no longer had anything to fear.

A senior British official said Saddam — who was being held at an undisclosed location and interrogated by the Central Intelligence Agency (CIA) — was still refusing to co-operate with his captors, but the former president's capture the previous month was yielding results "far greater than we expected," the official told reporters on condition of anonymity.

The US-led coalition had used documents found with the ex-leader to mount operations against Saddam loyalists, the official said.

See also

 Interrogation of Saddam Hussein
 Trial of Saddam Hussein
 Execution of Saddam Hussein
 High-value target
 Manhunt (military)

References

External links
 
 
 

Military operations of the Iraq War involving the United States
Military operations of the Iraq War in 2003
Operations involving American special forces
Saddam Hussein
Battles and conflicts without fatalities
December 2003 events in Iraq